This is a survey of the postage stamps and postal history of Uganda.

Uganda is a landlocked country in East Africa. It is bordered on the east by Kenya, on the north by South Sudan, on the west by the Democratic Republic of the Congo, on the southwest by Rwanda, and on the south by Tanzania. The southern part of the country includes a substantial portion of Lake Victoria, which is also bordered by Kenya and Tanzania.

British East Africa Company

The first stamps used in Uganda were the 1890 issues of the British East Africa Company.

Uganda Cowries

The Uganda Cowries were mission stamps typewritten by E. Millar in 1895; these stamps are among the most rarest and valuable postage stamps of the world.

Uganda Protectorate

In 1898 a set of seven stamps portraying Queen Victoria and inscribed Uganda Protectorate was issued.

Joint postal administrations (1902-1962)

Uganda then used stamps of East Africa & Uganda (1903-1922), Kenya & Uganda (1922-1927) and Kenya, Uganda and Tanganyika/Tanzania (1935-1976). Although Uganda had its own postal administration from 1962, commemoratives inscribed Kenya, Uganda and Tanzania remained in use until 1976.

Self-government (1962)
Uganda issued a set of four stamps on 28 July 1962 commemorating the centenary of Speke's discovery of the source of the Nile. This was the only set issued by Uganda as a self-governing state.

Independent (1962-)
The first stamps of independent Uganda were issued on 9 October 1962. Uganda regularly issues both commemorative and definitive stamps. The stamps of Uganda were also valid in Kenya and Tanzania until 1976.

See also 
Postage stamps and postal history of British East Africa
Postage stamps and postal history of East Africa and Uganda Protectorates
Postage stamps and postal history of Kenya, Uganda, Tanganyika
Postage stamps and postal history of Kenya
Postage stamps and postal history of Tanzania
 Uganda Cowries
 Posta Uganda

References

Further reading
 Goldberg, Larry. Identifying the Cancellations of Uganda: A Post Office Identification Handbook. Buffalo Grove, IL.: LMG Communications, Inc., 2001  66p.
 Lowe, Robson. The Uganda Missionaries. London: Robson Lowe Ltd., 1974 7p. Supplement to The Philatelist August 1974.
 Mackay, James A. East Africa: The Story of East Africa and its Stamps. London: Philatelic Publishers, Ltd., 1970 192p. Series Title: Collecta handbook ; no. 5.
Proud, Ted. The Postal History of Uganda and Zanzibar. Heathfield, Sussex: Postal History Publications Co., 1993.  433p.
 Trapnell, Dr. David H. The Early Postal History of Uganda: with Particular Reference to the Rev. Robert H. Walker, Acting CMS Postmaster (May 1897-May 1898) & the First Archdeacon of Uganda. s.l.: David H. Trapnell with support by the Stuart Rossiter Trust, 2002 154p.

Communications in Uganda
Uganda